Hexhamshire is a civil parish in Northern England. It was incorporated into Northumberland in 1572.

History
Hexhamshire was originally a single parish based on the church of St Andrew, Hexham, and surveys from 1295, 1547 and 1608 all show that the extent of its territory remained highly stable over time. It was probably formed from the lands gifted in 674 to Wilfrid, the Bishop of York, by the Northumbrian queen Æthelthryth to support the newly established Bishopric of Hexham. As the land was granted as a single block and formed part of the Queen's dowry, it probably constituted a single pre-existing territorial unit.

In 854 the diocese of Hexham was split between the dioceses of Lindisfarne and York, and by 883 the ownership of Hexhamshire had fallen into the hands of the Bishops of Lindisfarne. Government of Hexhamshire by the Provosts or Thegns of the Bishop of Durham, as successors to Lindisfarne, continued throughout the 11th century until 1071, when William the Conqueror's Harrying of the North saw Bishop Æthelwine flee to Lindisfarne, and Uthred, Provost of Hexhamshire, submitted authority over Hexhamshire to Thomas of Bayeux, the Archbishop of York.

The ownership of Hexhamshire by the see of York was confirmed by Henry I, and a regular system of administration was established.  Like County Durham, Hexhamshire was a "royal liberty", where the king's writ did not run, and the Archbishop of York enjoyed powers elsewhere held by the king, including complete judicial and administrative authority: pleas of the Crown could be held in his courts, he could hold inquisitions and regulate commercial activity, and he held the exclusive right of taxation. Administration of the territory was conducted by officials appointed by the archbishop, including a bailiff, justices and coroner. Royal officials were rigorously excluded from the territory and it maintained its independence from the royal eyre throughout the 13th century.

Until 1572 Hexhamshire also formed an independent county palatine. Justices of the Peace are recorded from 1358, and leading local families are first recorded being described as "of the county of Hexham" in official documents in 1376 and 1385. In 1408 a Scottish felon arrested for offences in Hexhamshire was released by royal justices on the basis that the acts had occurred "outside the county of Northumberland", and an Act of 1482 expressly listed Hexhamshire alongside Cheshire and County Durham as a county palatine where the proceeds of fines did not go to the king.

Hexham Abbey was dissolved in 1537 in the Dissolution of the monasteries, and after a series of local uprisings the Crown took possession of Hexhamshire in 1545. With the liberty in Crown hands its status became increasingly anachronistic, and in 1572 it was formally abolished. 

Hexhamshire was incorporated into Northumberland in 1572 by an Act of Parliament: 14 Eliz. 1 c. 13 ("An Act for the annexing of Hexhamshire to the Countye of Northumberland"). At the same time, the district was transferred from the see of Durham to the see of York, where it remained until 1837.

Parish
In modern use, Hexhamshire is the name of a civil parish south of Hexham. The parish covers a large but mostly sparsely populated area, including the villages of Dalton and Whitley Chapel, Broadwell House, and Hexhamshire Common. The civil parish was formed in 1955 by the union of the Hexhamshire High Quarter, Hexhamshire Middle Quarter, and Hexhamshire West Quarter parishes. Hexhamshire Low Quarter, to the north, was merged on 1 April 2011.

See also 
 Historic counties of England
 Allertonshire
 Hallamshire
 Howdenshire
 Richmondshire
 Winchcombeshire

References

Bibliography

External links 

Whitehall Methodist Church
Hexhamshire Website

History of Northumberland
Northumbria
Counties of England established in antiquity
Counties of England disestablished in 1572
Former counties of England
Hexham